Weissia is a genus of mosses, belonging to the family Pottiaceae.

The genus was described in 1801 by Johann Hedwig and the latest additions to the genus were in 1995 when Weissia ovatifolia and Weissia patula were added. As of July 2021, the genus contains 91 species.

Selected species:
 Weissia crispula
 Weissia controversa
 Weissia brachycarpa
 Weissia microstoma
 Weissia squarrosa
 Weissia xylopiae

Species
The genus Weissia contains the following species:

Weissia abbreviata 
Weissia alianuda 
Weissia andersoniana 
Weissia argentinica 
Weissia artocosana 
Weissia atra 
Weissia ayresii 
Weissia balansae 
Weissia balansaeana 
Weissia bizotii 
Weissia brachycarpa 
Weissia brachypelma 
Weissia brachypoma 
Weissia breutelii 
Weissia breviseta 
Weissia canaliculata 
Weissia condensa 
Weissia contermina 
Weissia controversa 
Weissia cucullata 
Weissia dieterlenii 
Weissia diffidentia 
Weissia edentula 
Weissia erythrogona 
Weissia exserta 
Weissia fallax 
Weissia felipponei 
Weissia fornicata 
Weissia ghatensis 
Weissia glazioui 
Weissia groenlandica 
Weissia humicola 
Weissia inoperculata 
Weissia jamaicensis 
Weissia kaikouraensis 
Weissia krassavinii 
Weissia kunzeana 
Weissia latifolia 
Weissia latiuscula 
Weissia levieri 
Weissia ligulaefolia 
Weissia lineaefolia 
Weissia longidens 
Weissia longifolia 
Weissia lorentzii 
Weissia ludoviciana 
Weissia macrospora 
Weissia micacea 
Weissia mittenii 
Weissia muhlenbergiana 
Weissia multicapsularis 
Weissia neocaledonica 
Weissia newcomeri 
Weissia nitida 
Weissia norkettii 
Weissia novae-valisiae 
Weissia obtusata 
Weissia obtusifolia 
Weissia occidentalis 
Weissia occulta 
Weissia opaca 
Weissia ovalis 
Weissia ovatifolia 
Weissia papillosa 
Weissia patagonica 
Weissia patula 
Weissia perpusilla 
Weissia pilifera 
Weissia platystegia 
Weissia ricciae 
Weissia riograndensis 
Weissia rostellata 
Weissia rutilans 
Weissia semidiaphana 
Weissia semiinvoluta 
Weissia semipallida 
Weissia sharpii 
Weissia simplex 
Weissia socotrana 
Weissia splachnum 
Weissia squarrosa 
Weissia sterilis 
Weissia subacaulis 
Weissia submicacea 
Weissia termitidarum 
Weissia triumphans 
Weissia tyrrhena 
Weissia vardei 
Weissia veviridis 
Weissia welwitschii 
Weissia willisiana

References

Pottiaceae
Moss genera